James Dyson (born 1947) is a British inventor, industrial designer and founder of Dyson Ltd..

James Dyson may also refer to:

James Dyson (schoolmaster) (1875–1956), headmaster of grammar schools at Ripon and Boston, grandfather of the inventor 
 James Dyson (physicist) (1914–1990), scientist at the National Physical Laboratory
 James Dyson (footballer) (born 1979), former Birmingham City F.C. football player
 James Dyson (minister) (1950–2020), American minister and teacher.